Archange is a given name. Notable people with the name include:

Archange de Lyon (1736–1822), French Capuchin theologian and preacher
Archange Nkumu (born 1993), English footballer

See also
Archangel (disambiguation)